Ralph Andrews Sorenson (March 27, 1927 – May 15, 2020) was a politician from Alberta, Canada. He served in the Legislative Assembly of Alberta from 1971 to 1975 as a member of the Social Credit caucus in the official opposition.

Political career
Sorenson ran for a seat to the Alberta Legislature in the 1971 general election. He won by less than 300 votes over Progressive Conservative candidate Herb Losness in the electoral district of Sedgewick-Coronation.  In the 1975 general election, he was defeated by Progressive Conservative candidate Henry Kroeger.

References

External links
Legislative Assembly of Alberta Members Listing

Alberta Social Credit Party MLAs
1927 births
2020 deaths